The Global Atmospheric Research Program was a fifteen-year international research programme led by the World Meteorological Organization and the International Council of Scientific Unions. It began in 1967 and organised several important field experiments including GARP Atlantic Tropical Experiment in 1974 and the Alpine Experiment (ALPEX) in 1982. Its field experiments helped make significant progress in meteorology in particular allowing major improvements in Numerical Weather Prediction.

GATE Timeline

References

 Barron, Eric J. (1992) A Decade of International Climate Research: The First Ten Years of World Climate Research Program US National Academies Press pages 1-2
 Weart, Spencer R. (2003) The Discovery of Global Warming Harvard University Press  pages 99-100
 Philander, S. George (2012) Encyclopedia of Global Warming and Climate Change SAGE Publications  page 634

External links
NCAR Archives GARP Records
American Meteorological Society
The Beginnings of WMO (1950s-1960s)
ICSU and Climate Science
A Review of the GARP Atlantic Tropical Experiment (GATE) PDF

Earth sciences organizations